Isaac Durnford (born February 26, 1998) is a Canadian actor, best known for his role as Cory Schluter in the Canadian TV series Dino Dan.

Filmography

References

1998 births
Living people
Canadian male film actors
Canadian male television actors
Male actors from Ontario